"Bebe le Strange" is a song recorded by the rock band Heart. It was released in 1980 as the second single from the band's fifth studio album Bébé le Strange.  It was the first song from the band not to chart on the U.S. Billboard Hot 100, and was the final single released from the album.  Heart's fortunes reversed later in 1980 with the release of "Tell It Like It Is", which became a U.S. top-ten single.

Cash Box called it "aggressive, two-fisted rock ‘n’ roll" with "brawny bass and guitar riffs."

Chart performance

References 

Heart (band) songs
1980 singles
Songs written by Ann Wilson
Songs written by Nancy Wilson (rock musician)
Songs written by Sue Ennis
1980 songs
Epic Records singles
Song recordings produced by Mike Flicker